Lozenets (also Lozenec or Lozenetz) may refer to:

 Lozenets, Burgas Province, a village in Bulgaria
 Lozenets, Dobrich Province, a village in Bulgaria
 Lozenets, Yambol Province, a village in Bulgaria
 Lozenets, Sofia, a municipality of Sofia, Bulgaria